Discherodontus schroederi is a freshwater fish native to the Chao Phraya and Mae Klong basins in Thailand and to the Mekong basin in Laos. It inhabits submontane and hill streams and has also been found in the mainstream Mekong. Young individuals might occur in shaded, nearly stagnant side pools.

References

Cyprinid fish of Asia
Fish described in 1945
Fish of the Mekong Basin
Fish of Laos
Fish of Thailand
Taxa named by Hobart Muir Smith